Alexandre Breffort (1901–1971) was a French screenwriter.

Selected filmography
 Follow That Man (1953)

1901 births
1971 deaths
French male screenwriters
20th-century French screenwriters
20th-century French male writers